DV is a digital video format.

DV may also refer to:

In arts and media
 D.V., a 1984 autobiography of fashion icon Diana Vreeland
 DV (newspaper), an Icelandic newspaper, formerly 

In law and government
 Developed Vetting, a high-level security clearance for access to classified information in the United Kingdom
 Diversity Immigrant Visa, or Green Card Lottery, a US lottery program for receiving a Permanent Resident Card
 Domestic violence, a form of physical, verbal, or sexual abuse directed at family members

In science and technology
 Delta-v, in spaceflight, a measure of the impulse needed to perform a maneuver 
 Dietary Reference Intake or Daily Value, a nutrition term
 Dependent variable, in mathematical and statistical modelling
 DESQview, a text-mode DOS multitasking environment by Quarterdeck Office Systems
 Distance vector, a term used in network routing protocols
 Distant vision, in eyeglass prescriptions

Other uses
 DV, Roman numeral representation of the number 505
 , a major document from the Second Vatican Council
 , Latin for 'God willing'
 Maldivian language, and dialects Dhivehi and Mahl (ISO 639-1 alpha-2 code DV)
 Albatros D.V, a German World War I fighter plane
 SCAT Airlines, by IATA airline code
 Dambulla Viiking, a team participating in Lanka Premier League

See also

 505 (disambiguation); "DV" is 505 in Roman numerals
 
 VD (disambiguation)
 D (disambiguation)
 V (disambiguation)